The annual IIFA Utsavam rewards the artistic and technical achievements of the South Indian film industry. The ceremony is organised by Wizcraft International, the team behind the IIFA Awards, and represents Tamil cinema, Telugu cinema, Malayalam cinema and Kannada cinema.

The ceremony was instituted in 2016, after the 2015 South Indian floods had delayed the event from December 2015. The Awards are presented in separate parts on two different days. On the first day the most promising upcoming South Indian film artistes from the Tamil and Malayalam film industries are honoured, while the second day honours artists & technicians of the Telugu and Kannada film industries. The Award nominees are selected by a jury of senior artistes and professionals and voted for by public polling.

History
In October 2015, the team behind the IIFA Awards announced that they would create a platform titled IIFA Utsavam, in order to reward the achievements of the South Indian film industry. The inaugural show was announced to be held in Hyderabad between 4 and 6 December. On 3 December 2015, Andre Timmins of the IIFA Management announced that the show would be postponed as a result of the 2015 Chennai floods and that the event would be held as a fundraiser at a later date. The show was subsequently rearranged and held from 24 to 25 January, with the proceeds of the events going on to help with recuperation efforts from the 2015 Chennai floods.

As a part of the inaugural event, the makers organised the FICCI-IIFA Media & Entertainment business conclave in order to create a synthesis of business and entertainment, with Ramesh Sippy, and Rakeysh Omprakash Mehra being amongst the guest speakers. The organisers stated that the next two annual shows will be held in Hyderabad, before taking the show abroad.

Ceremonies

Award categories
Best Picture 
Best Director
Best Actor
Best Actress
Best Supporting Actor
Best Supporting Actress
Best Actor in a Negative Role
Best Actor in a Comic Role
Best Music Director
Best Lyricist
Best Male Playback Singer
Best Female Playback Singer
Best Story
Best Screenplay
Best Makeup Artist

References

External links
 Official website

 
International Indian Film Academy Awards
Indian film awards
Tamil film awards
2016 in Indian cinema
Awards established in 2016
2016 establishments in India
Telugu film awards